Rick Charls is a former American high diver who held the world record for the highest dive of .

Background 
Charls, a native of Cincinnati, Ohio, was a high school and collegiate All-American and a two-time Mid-American Conference diving champion at Ohio University.

Career 
Charls made his record-breaking dive at SeaWorld San Diego, which was viewed by millions of people on ABC's Wide World of Sports. The dive was performed in conjunction with the Guinness World Records and the International Swimming Hall of Fame. Since 1983, many divers have tried to break this record, but sustained injuries upon impact with the water and had to be rescued.

Charls, Rick Winters, Bruce Boccia, Mike Foley and Dana Kunze were the only divers to receive credit for the  dive. Charls also earned honors as the 1980 world tandem high diving champion, along with third-place finishes and bronze medals at the 1982 World Target High Diving Championships in Hawaii and the World Acrobatic High Diving Championships at SeaWorld in Florida.

References 

American male divers
Living people
Male high divers
Ohio Bobcats athletes
Sportspeople from Cincinnati
Year of birth missing (living people)
World record holders